The 1964 state highway renumbering was a reorganization of state highways in the U.S. state of Washington. The new system, based on sign routes (SR, later changed to state routes), replaced the primary and secondary highway system implemented in 1937. It was first signed in January 1964 and codified into the Revised Code of Washington in 1970.

History   

The former numbering system of primary and secondary state highways, using lettered suffixes and unnamed branches, created confusion for motorists as the system expanded. The system also ignored, or conflicted with, the federal highway system and the then-developing Interstate Highway System. The state highway department originally planned for a major highway renumbering in 1957, expanding on the existing primary and secondary system with numbers as high as 59, but serious consideration of a full-scale renumbering began in 1962. It had the specific goal of replacing letter suffixes with two- and three-digit numbers, which would not repeat or conflict with each other or with federal route numbers.

In 1963, the Washington State Legislature passed a law authorizing the creation of a new state highway numbering system under the direction of the Washington State Highway Commission. The law came in response to confusion experienced by tourists visiting during the 1962 World's Fair, held in Seattle. The highway commission approved its numbering plan on June 19, 1963, using even numbers for east–west routes and odd numbers for north–south routes; primary routes would have lower numbers, while secondary routes would use the first digit to indicate its parent route. Federal highways, including Interstate highways, would retain their designations and be incorporated into the system. The new numbering system took effect on January 15, 1964, and new signs were posted at a cost of $115,000.

Route renumbering

New Sign Route numbers

References

Washington State Highway Commission, Identification of State Highways, December 1, 1965

External links
 Highways of Washington State

Renumbering
Renumbering
State Highway Renumbering (Washington), 1964
State Highway Renumbering (Washington), 1964
History of Washington (state)
Lists of roads in Washington (state)
Highway renumbering in the United States